Stuart Margolin (January 31, 1940 – December 12, 2022) was an American film, theater, and television actor and director who won two Emmy Awards for playing Evelyn "Angel" Martin on the 1970s television series The Rockford Files. In 1973, he appeared on Gunsmoke as an outlaw. The next year he played an important role, giving Charles Bronson his first gun in Death Wish. In 1981, Margolin portrayed the character of Philo Sandeen in a recurring role as a Native American tracker in the 1981–1982 television series, Bret Maverick.

Early life 
Margolin was born January 31, 1940, in Davenport, Iowa, to  Morris and Gertrude Margolin but spent much of his childhood in Dallas, Texas, where he learned to golf.

Margolin stated that he led a "hoodlum" childhood, was kicked out of Texas public schools, and was sent by his parents to a boarding school in Tennessee. While he attended that school, his family moved to Scottsdale, Arizona. When Margolin was released from reform school and moved back with his family, he decided to move back, on his own, to see his friends in Dallas. His parents made arrangements for him to attend a private school there.

Television and film 
Margolin played the recurring character Evelyn "Angel" Martin, the shifty friend and former jailmate of Jim Rockford (James Garner) on The Rockford Files, whose various cons and schemes usually got Rockford in hot water. Margolin was earlier paired with Garner in the Western series Nichols (1971–72), in which he played a character somewhat similar to the Angel character in The Rockford Files. That show lasted for only one season.

At times Rockford would pay Angel to "hit the streets" and discover information that would help solve a case. Margolin won the Primetime Emmy Award for Outstanding Supporting Actor in a Drama Series for this role, in 1979 and 1980; he is one of only five actors to win this award twice for the same role.

In 1969, Margolin wrote and co-produced The Ballad of Andy Crocker, an ABC television movie that was one of the first films to deal with the subject matter of Vietnam veterans "coming home". He also co-wrote the title song and had an uncredited cameo in the film. Margolin had an uncredited role as the Station Wagon Driver in Heroes, another story about Vietnam veterans dealing with what we now refer to as PTSD.

Margolin played Rabbi David Small in the 1976 movie, Lanigan's Rabbi, based on the series of mystery novels written by Harry Kemelman. Scheduling conflicts prevented him from continuing the role in the short-lived TV series of the same name that aired in 1977 as part of The NBC Sunday Mystery Movie, in which the character was played by actor Bruce Solomon.

Margolin appeared in episodes of the television series M*A*S*H ("Bananas, Crackers and Nuts" and "Operation Noselift"), The Partridge Family ("Go Directly to Jail" and "A Penny for His Thoughts"), That Girl, The Mary Tyler Moore Show, Rhoda,  Land of the Giants, Twelve O'Clock High, The Monkees, Love, American Style (in which he was a member of the Love American Style Players; his brother Arnold Margolin was the executive producer of the series), The Fall Guy, Magnum, P.I., Hill Street Blues (as bookmaker Andy Sedita in the consecutive episodes "Hacked to Pieces" and "Seoul on Ice"), and Touched by an Angel. In May 2009, Margolin appeared on an episode of 30 Rock, opposite Alan Alda; it was the first time the two actors appeared together since Margolin's appearance on M*A*S*H in 1974.

In Canada, Margolin appeared in the 2009 CTV/CBS police drama series The Bridge. Margolin appeared as bail jumper Stanley Wescott in the episode The Overpass (Season 5 Episode 2; 2013) of the Canadian CBC Television series Republic of Doyle, which itself was inspired by The Rockford Files. While not a wholesale recreation of the Angel Martin character, the Stanley Wescott role sported many similar attributes. The episode also featured Margolin's stepson, Max Martini, in the role of Big Charlie Archer.

Margolin appeared in such feature films including Kelly's Heroes, Death Wish, Futureworld, The Big Bus, and S.O.B.

Directing 
Margolin directed TV shows since the early 1970s, including episodes of The Mary Tyler Moore Show, Sara, The Love Boat; Magnum, P.I., Bret Maverick, Quantum Leap, Wonder Woman, and Northern Exposure.

In addition to acting in the original and 1990s TV movie versions of The Rockford Files, Margolin also directed some episodes: "Dirty Money, Black Light" (1977), "Caledonia – It's Worth a Fortune!" (1974), "The Rockford Files: Friends and Foul Play" (1996), "The Rockford Files: If It Bleeds... It Leads" (1998).

He won the 1996 DGA Award for children's programming for directing the film Salt Water Moose, and he was nominated again for the same award for directing the 1998 film, The Sweetest Gift. He was also nominated for a DGA Award for drama series direction for a 1991 episode of Northern Exposure entitled "Goodbye to All That". He directed, co-starred and scored The Glitter Dome (1984) for HBO Pictures.

Other 

Margolin wrote several songs for and with longtime friend and singer-songwriter Jerry Riopelle that have appeared on Riopelle's albums since 1967. Margolin was first associated with Riopelle's late 1960s band the Parade, co-writing many of their songs and playing percussion on various tracks. He and Riopelle (along with Shango member Tommy Reynolds) co-wrote Shango's 1969 Caribbean-flavored novelty record "Day After Day (It's Slippin' Away)", which hit No. 57 on the U.S. charts and No. 39 in Canada.

Margolin had tracks he co-wrote covered by R. B. Greaves and Gary Lewis and the Playboys in 1968–69. Margolin's frequent songwriting partner Jerry Riopelle established a long-running solo career beginning in 1971; Riopelle released 8 albums between 1971 and 1982, every one of which contained at least one song (often more) written or co-written by Margolin. In turn, Margolin released a solo album in 1980, And the Angel Sings, which featured his interpretations of a number of Margolin and/or Riopelle compositions previously recorded by Riopelle.

Starting in 2004, he was a regular participant in the theater program of the Chautauqua Institution.

Personal life and death 
He married Patricia Dunne Martini in 1982. He had three stepchildren: actor Max Martini, costume designer Michelle Martini and editor/ producer/ director Christopher Martini.

He was the younger brother of Emmy-winning director/producer/writer Arnold Margolin, both of them lived in Lewisburg, West Virginia, and acted together there in a professional community theater production of Laughter on the 23rd Floor.

Margolin had frequently been misidentified as the brother of actress Janet Margolin (1943–1993); the two were not related, although they appeared together as husband and wife in the pilot for the 1977 TV series Lanigan's Rabbi.

Margolin, his wife and stepchildren lived on Salt Spring Island in British Columbia, Canada for twenty two years.

According to stepdaughter Michelle Martini, Margolin had been diagnosed with pancreatic cancer a decade earlier. He died in Staunton, Virginia, on December 12, 2022.

Selected filmography 

Films
 Women of the Prehistoric Planet (1966) – Chief
 Don't Just Stand There! (1968) – Remy
 The Gamblers (1970) – Goldy
 Kelly's Heroes (1970) – Little Joe
 Limbo (1972) – Phil Garrett
 The Stone Killer (1973) – Lawrence
 Death Wish (1974) – Ames Jainchill
 The California Kid (1974, TV Movie) – Deputy
 The Gambler (1974) – Cowboy
 The Big Bus (1976) – Alex
 Futureworld (1976) – Harry
 Heroes (1977) – Motorist at Garage (uncredited)
 Days of Heaven (1978) – Mill Foreman
 S.O.B. (1981) – Gary Murdock
 Class (1983) – Balaban
 A Killer in the Family (1983, TV Movie) – Randy Greenawalt
 Running Hot (1984) – Officer Trent
 The Glitter Dome (1984, TV Movie) – Herman Sinclair
 A Fine Mess (1986) – Maurice 'Binky' Drundza
 Iron Eagle II (1988) – Gen. Stillmore
 Bye Bye Blues (1989) – Slim Godfrey
 Deep Sleep (1990) – Bob
 Guilty by Suspicion (1991) – Abe Barron
 Impolite (1992) – I.M. Penner
 The Lay of the Land (1997) – Carmine Ficcone
 The Hi-Line (1999) – Clyde Johnson
 The Hoax (2006) – Martin Ackerman
 Arbitrage (2012) – Syd Felder
 The Discoverers (2012) – Stanley Birch
 The Second Time Around (2016) – Isaac
 Sgt. Will Gardner (2019) – Mr. Glenn
 What the Night Can Do (2020) – Hugh Dryer

Television (acting)
 The Gertrude Berg Show – Lester Wexler – Episode "Lonely Sunday" (1961)
 Ensign O'Toole – Lt. Miller – 4 episodes (1962)
 The Lieutenant – Cpl. Merle Purveau – Episode "A Very Private Affair" (1963)
 Burke's Law – Young Man – Episode "Who Killed Sweet Betsy?" (1963)
 Channing – 2 episodes (1963/1964)
 Twelve O'Clock High (TV series) – "Mutiny at Ten Thousand Feet" (1965)
 The Fugitive – Jimmy – Episode "The End Game" (1964)
 Occasional Wife – Bernie Kramer (1966/1967)
 The Virginian – Abe Yeager (1967)
 That Girl – Dr. Phillip L. Priddy / Leonard Stanley / Talley (1968)
 It Takes a Thief – Sagalis / Dimitri Stavro / Prison Chaplain (1968)
 The Monkees – Captain (1968)
 Love, American Style (1969) – "Love and the Comedy Team"
 The Partridge Family – Hank; Snake (1970/1972)
 Nichols (1971–1972) – Mitch
 The Mary Tyler Moore Show (1973) – Warren Sturgis – Episode "Romeo and Mary"
 Cannon (1973) – Roger Henry – Episode "Press Pass to the Slammer"
 Gunsmoke – Brownie (1974)
 Rhoda – Dr. Arthur Alborn - Episode "If You Want to Shoot the Rapids, You Have to Get Wet" (1975)
 M*A*S*H
Season 1 (1972): 'Bananas, Crackers and Nuts' – Capt. Phillip Sherman
Season 2 (1973): 'Operation Noselift' – Major Stanley "Stosh" Robbins
 The Rockford Files – Evelyn "Angel" Martin (1974–1979)
 Bret Maverick (1981) – Philo Sandeen
 Magnum P.I – Rod Crysler – Episode "...by its cover" (1983)
 Hill Street Blues – Andy Sedita – Season 6 episodes "Hacked to Pieces" and "Seoul on Ice" (1985)
 Mom P.I. (1990–1992) – Bernie Fox
 Matlock – Nelson Adelson – Episodes – The Evening News parts 1 and 2 (1992)
 Stone Undercover – Jack Welsh – 26 episodes (2002–2004)
 Intelligence (2006) – Flannegan – Recurring
 30 Rock (2009) – Fred
 Republic of Doyle – Stanley Westcott (2013)
 NCIS – Felix Betts (2014)
 The X-Files'' – Dr. They (2018) Episode "The Lost Art of Forehead Sweat"

References

External links 

Stuart Margolin(Aveleyman)
 

1940 births
2022 deaths
American male film actors
American male television actors
American television directors
American television writers
American male television writers
Outstanding Performance by a Supporting Actor in a Drama Series Primetime Emmy Award winners
Actors from Davenport, Iowa
Writers from Davenport, Iowa
Directors Guild of America Award winners
Jewish American male actors
Jewish American screenwriters
20th-century American male actors
21st-century American male actors
Screenwriters from Iowa
Best Supporting Actor in a Comedy Series Canadian Screen Award winners